Șișești is a commune in Maramureș County, Romania. It is composed of seven villages: Bontăieni (Pusztatelek), Cetățele (Györkefalva), Dănești (Bajfalu), Negreia (Nyegrefalva), Plopiș (Nyárfás), Șișești and Șurdești (Dióshalom).

In 2002, the commune had a population of 5479, of whom 99.6% were ethnic Romanians. 55.3% were Romanian Orthodox, 40.7% were Greek-Catholic, and 2.5% were Pentecostal.

Politics 
Șișești is administrated by a mayor a Local Council formed by 15 councilors. The actual mayor is Ioan Mircea Tentiș, from PNL. Local Council is formed by 10 PNL councilors, 4 PSD and an independent councilor.

Șișești

Bontăieni 
The first mention of the Bontăieni village was in 1648 as Pusztatelek. In 2011, the village population was 249.

Cetățele 
The first mention of the Cetățele village was in 1411 as Gywkefalwa. In 2011, the village population was 624.

Dănești 
The first mention of the Dănești village was in 1405 as Balkonia. In 2011, the village population was 627.

In the interwar period, the teacher Pop Dariu (1877, Măgura Ilvei-1965) carried out a research on the existence of Romanian writings in more than 50 statuary churches. At Dănești (formerly in Satu Mare county) he discovered a notebook where a "Romanian history" was copied after another manuscript from 1861 with an unidentified author. The book was written in a winter time by Poduţ Gabor, rummaged at the local church and ended on January 8, 1871.

Negreia

Plopiș

Plopiș has a Church of the Archangels Michael and Gabriel, built in 1796; it is one of eight Wooden Churches of Maramureș that are listed by UNESCO as a World Heritage Site.

Șurdești

Surdești has a Church of the Archangels Michael and Gabriel belonging to the Romanian Greek-Catholic denomination and dates from the 18th century. It is one of eight Wooden Churches of Maramureș listed by UNESCO as a World Heritage Site.

Notes

Communes in Maramureș County